The Bolovan is a left tributary of the river Geamăna in Romania. It flows into the Geamăna in the village Geamăna.

References

Rivers of Olt County
Rivers of Vâlcea County
Rivers of Romania